Junctophilin 2, also known as JPH2, is a protein which in humans is encoded by the JPH2 gene. Alternative splicing has been observed at this locus and two variants encoding distinct isoforms are described.

Function 

Junctional complexes between the plasma membrane and endoplasmic/sarcoplasmic reticulum are a common feature of all excitable cell types and mediate cross talk between cell surface and intracellular ion channels. The protein encoded by this gene is a component of junctional complexes and is composed of a C-terminal hydrophobic segment spanning the endoplasmic/sarcoplasmic reticulum membrane and a remaining cytoplasmic membrane occupation and recognition nexus (MORN) domain that shows specific affinity for the plasma membrane. JPH2 is a member of the junctophilin gene family (the other members of the family are JPH1, JPH3, and JPH4) and is the predominant isoform in cardiac tissue, but is also expressed with JPH1 in skeletal muscle. The JPH2 protein product plays a critical role in maintaining the spacing a geometry of the cardiac dyad - the space between the plasma membrane and sarcoplasmic reticulum.  These cardiac dyads also known as junctional membrane complexes or calcium release units are thought to play a key role in calcium induced calcium release by approximating L-type calcium channels on the plasma membrane and ryanodine receptor type 2 on the sarcoplasmic reticulum. JPH2 also contains an evolutionarily conserved nuclear localization signal and a DNA binding domain. During (heart) disease, stress-activated calpain converts the full length JPH2 into fragments. The N-terminal fragment (including nuclear localization signal and DNA binding domain) is translocated to nucleus and regulates gene transcription.

Role in Disease 
Mutations in JPH2 were identified in a cohort of patients with hypertrophic cardiomyopathy who lacked the traditional mutations in sarcomere proteins. JPH2 has been shown to be downregulated in several animal models of heart failure. A JPH2 knock-out mouse model is lethal at embryonic day 10.5, which is around the time when cardiac contractility should initiate.  These mice showed abnormal cardiac calcium handling, cardiomyopathy, and altered junctional membrane complex formation.

References

Further reading